Wenjiang District is one of 11 urban districts of the prefecture-level city of Chengdu, the capital of Sichuan Province, Southwest China, covering part of the western suburbs. It is bordered by Qingyang District to the east, Shuangliu County to the southeast, Chongzhou to the southwest, Dujiangyan to the northwest, and Pi County to the east.

Climate

Wenjiang has a humid subtropical climate and is largely warm with high relative humidity all year around.

Government

Administrative divisions
The Wenjiang District is divided into 6 subdistricts and 3 towns.

Subdistricts 
The six subdistricts of Wenjiang are as follows:

 
 
 
 
 Yongning Subdistrict
 

Towns 
The three towns of Wenjiang are as follows:

 
 
 

Economy 
Wenjiang district reported a GDP of 54.5 billion Yuan for 2018, an 8.8% increase from 2018. The following table shows a breakdown of the district's GDP:

References

External links

Districts of Chengdu